This is a list of German states by household income per capita in 2019 according to the Federal Statistical Office of Germany.

See also

 List of German states by area
 List of German states by population
 List of German states by population density
 List of German states by GDP
 List of German states by Human Development Index
 List of German states by fertility rate
 List of German states by life expectancy
 List of German states by unemployment rate
 List of German states by exports

References

External links 
 Federal Statistical Office

Household income
Germany, Household income
Household income by state